The 2014–15 Serie B was the 83rd season since its establishment in 1929. A total of 22 teams contested the league: 14 of which returning from the 2013–14 season, 5 of which promoted from Prima Divisione, and three relegated from Serie A. The original concept was that due to Siena's exclusion because of financial issues and the fact such vacancy will not be filled in preparation of a future reduction to a league composed by 20 teams, this season featured 21 participant clubs instead of the usual 22. However, on 11 August 2014, Novara won an appeal and the league confirmed a 22nd team. On 29 August, the league chose Vicenza Calcio as the 22nd participant.

The series have 42 weeks of play. The opening games of the season began on 30 August 2014, and the final matches  took place on 22 May 2015.

Teams
Relegated from 2013–14 Serie A:

Catania
Bologna
Livorno

From 2013–14 Serie B:

Latina
Modena
Crotone
Bari
Spezia
Lanciano
Avellino
Carpi
Brescia
Trapani
Pescara
Ternana
Cittadella
Varese

Promoted from 2013–14 Prima Divisione:

 Virtus Entella
 Perugia
 Pro Vercelli
 Frosinone
 Further: Vicenza, which took the place of Siena.

Stadia and locations

Personnel and kits

Managerial changes

Ownership changes

League table

Playoffs

Promotion playoffs
Six teams will play in the promotion playoffs. A preliminary one-legged round, played at the home venue of the higher placed team, involved the teams from 5th to 8th place. The two winning teams will then play against the 3rd and 4th-placed teams in two-legged semifinals. The higher placed team plays the second leg of the promotion playoff at home. If scores are tied after both games in the semifinals, the higher placed team progresses to the final. The same conditions apply to the final.

Relegation play-out
In case of an aggregate tie, the higher placed team wins.

The matches later became null and void following Catania’s disqualification.

Results

Statistics

Top goalscorers
Updated including all games played up until May 22, 2015

Source: Official Goalscorers' Standings

References

Serie B seasons
Italy
2014–15 in Italian football leagues